Live! Thirty Days Ago is a live album by French rock band Phoenix, originally recorded during their September and October 2004 tour of Scandinavia and released on 8 November 2004.

In the United Kingdom and the United States it was only available via digital download after 30 November 2004, and was released on CD on 11 January 2005 in the UK and 22 February 2005 in the US.

Track listing

"Run Run Run", "Victim of the Crime", "Too Young", and "Alphabetical" recorded 1 October 2004 in Vega, Copenhagen, Denmark.
"I'm an Actor" recorded 28 September 2004 in Tavastia, Helsinki, Finland.
"Funky Squaredance", "(You Can't Blame It On) Anybody", and "If I Ever Feel Better" recorded 24 September 2004 in Rockefeller, Oslo, Norway.
"Everything is Everything" recorded 29 September 2004 in Berns, Stockholm, Sweden.
"Love for Granted" recorded 20 September 2004 in Folken, Stavanger, Norway.

Personnel
Deck D'Arcy – bass guitar and backing vocals
Laurent Brancowitz – guitar, keyboards and backing vocals
Thomas Mars – lead vocals
Christian Mazzalai – guitar and backing vocals
Chassol – keyboards
Lawrence Clais – drums and backing vocals

References

Phoenix (band) albums
2004 live albums
Astralwerks live albums
Virgin Records live albums